The Roman Catholic Diocese of Port Elizabeth is a diocese located in the city of Port Elizabeth in the Ecclesiastical province of Cape Town in South Africa.

History
On July 30, 1847, an ecclesiastical territory was established as the Apostolic Vicariate of Cape of Good Hope, Eastern District from the Apostolic Vicariate of Cape of Good Hope and adjacent territories. Later the Eastern Vicariate was itself subdivided three times.

On 27 December 1847, Dr. Aidan Devereux was consecrated, in Cape Town, Bishop of Paneas and first Vicar Apostolic of the Eastern Vicariate, by Dr. Griffith, under whom he had worked for nine years. Through the Dhanis family of Belgium the new vicar Apostolic received the first considerable funds to start work. But his life was spent in the turmoil of wars, and was a struggle with poverty and the dearth of priests. His successor, Dr. Patrick Moran, had been curate of Irishtown, Dublin, and arrived in the colony in November, 1856. He was a man of energy, and a strenuous opponent of the grant of responsible government. The Sacred Congregation of Propaganda appointed him first Bishop of Dunedin, New Zealand, in 1870. Next year, the Rev. James David Richards was consecrated bishop at Grahamstown, as titular bishop of Retimo, by the Vicar Apostolic of Natal, Dr. Allard. Dr. Richards had already spent twenty-two years in the country and, whether as a writer, or lecturer, or pastor, had left his mark in the land. He founded the Cape Colonist, a paper which had campaigning views on purity in public life and on the native problems. In 1880 he brought to South Africa the first contingent of Trappists, as teachers. About two years before Dr. Ricards's death a coadjutor was appointed in the person of Dr. Peter Strobino, who, however, became an invalid soon after the death of Dr. Ricards. Dr. Strobino was succeeded in 1896 by his coadjutor, the Rt. Rev. Hugh MacSherry, formerly administrator of the diocese of Dundalk in Ireland, who had been consecrated a few months before.

 June 13, 1939: Renamed as Apostolic Vicariate of Port Elizabeth
 January 11, 1951: Promoted as Diocese of Port Elizabeth

Special churches
 The cathedral is Cathedral of St. Augustine in Port Elizabeth.
 The Port Elizabeth Oratory serves the parish of St Bernadette in Walmer.

Bishops
 Vicars Apostolic of Cape of Good Hope, Eastern District (Roman rite)
 Bishop Patrick Raymond Griffith, O.P. (1837.06.06 - 1847.07.30), appointed Vicar Apostolic of Cape of Good Hope, Western District {Capo di Buona Speranza, Distretto Occidentale})
 Bishop Aidan Devereux (1847–1854.02.11)
 Fr. Michael Jones (1854.09.26), did not take effect and he was never consecrated bishop
 Bishop Edward MacCabe (1855.01.30), did not take effect; was appointed bishop at the time but was not consecrated until 1877; future Archbishop and Cardinal
 Bishop Patrick Moran (1856–1869.12.03) appointed Bishop of Dunedin, New Zealand
 Bishop James David Richards (1871.01.13 – 1893.11.30)
 Bishop Peter Strobino (1893.11.30 – 1896.10.01)
 Bishop Hugh McSherry (1896.10.01 – 1938.12.15), appointed Archbishop upon retirement
 Vicars Apostolic of Port Elizabeth (Roman rite)
 Bishop James Colbert (1939.06.13 – 1948.12.09), Irish born (Cork) bishop 
 Bishop Hugh Boyle (1948.12.09 – 1951.01.11 see below)
 Bishops of Port Elizabeth (Roman rite)
 Bishop Hugh Boyle (see above 1951.01.11 – 1954.07.18), appointed Bishop of Johannesburg
 Bishop Ernest Arthur Green (1955.04.19 – 1970.12.27), South African born bishop (educated in Ireland)
 Bishop John Patrick Murphy (1972.05.06 – 1986.03.21)
 Bishop Michael Gower Coleman (1986.03.21 - 2011.08.20))
 Bishop Vincent Mduduzi Zungu, O.F.M. (2014.02.02 -)

Coadjutor Bishops
Hugh McSherry (1896), as Coadjutor Vicar Apostolic
Pietro Strobino (1891-1893)

See also
Roman Catholicism in South Africa
Port Elizabeth Oratory

References
 GCatholic.org
 Catholic Hierarchy

Roman Catholic dioceses in South Africa
Religious organizations established in 1847
Roman Catholic dioceses and prelatures established in the 19th century
1847 establishments in the Cape Colony
1847 establishments in South Africa
Roman Catholic Ecclesiastical Province of Cape Town